Pseudomelieria argentina is a species of ulidiid or picture-winged fly in the genus Pseudomelieria of the family Ulidiidae.

References

Ulidiidae